The arckite or twinskin kite is a type of traction kite designed and patented by Peter Lynn. It is a very stable, safe and secure type of powerkite. It can be used for all kinds of kite powered sports, for example: kiteboarding, landboarding, kite buggying or snowkiting. The shape of the kite is similar to a C shaped leading edge inflatable kite,  however the construction is similar to a foil kite.  These kites also fall into a category of foils called "closed-cell inflatables", meaning that the ram-air inlets on the leading edge of the kite are normally closed by flaps that act as one-way valves to maintain internal air pressure.  It is this feature that makes the kite useful for kitesurfing since, unlike standard open-cell foils, if the kite crashes on the water, it will stay inflated and float long enough for the rider to recover and re-launch.

History
 1999-2000 S-Arc 
 2002 F-Arc
 2003 Guerilla & Phantom
 2004 Bomba & Guerilla II
 2005 Venom
 2006 Venom II & Vortex
 2007 Scorpion
 2008 Synergy
 2009 Charger
 2012 Phantom II
 2013 Charger 2013

Styles
Depending on the specific style of the kite its suitable better for different usages, however, each of the kites can be used on all terrain.

Land based kites (highest aspect ratio)
Kites which are not as easy to water relaunch, but have better depower and upper wind range.
 Phantom
 Scorpion
 Phantom II

Water based low aspect ratio
 S-Arc
 Bomba
 Vortex

Water based high aspect ratio
Better low wind performance, 
 F-Arc
 Guerila I & Guerilla II
 Venom I & Venom II
 Synergy
 Charger

References
Official web site

Kites